Bube is a surname. Notable people with the surname include:

Andreas Bube (born 1987), Danish middle-distance runner
Richard H. Bube (1927–2018), American scientist and writer

See also
Bube language, a Bantu language